Asya is the name of a Turkish album by Asya. It is her second and best selling studio album, released in Turkey.

Track listing
"İsyankar" (Mutinous) 
"Beni Aldattın" (You Duped Me) 
"Canımın Yarısı" (Half of My Heart)
"Ayrılmak Zor" (Parting with You is Hard) 
"Kan Kırmızı" (Bloody Red)
"Oyalama Beni" (Don't Detain Me)
"Affetmem" (I don't Forgive You)
"Aşk Bana Günah" 
"Bir Yağmur Damlası" (A Raindrop)
"Vazgeçmedim" 
"İsyankar ("Mutinous" Remix)"

Music & Lyrics
Leyla Tuna, Gökhan Kırdar, Mustafa Sandal, Ayhan Çakar, Nilüfer, Aysel Gürel, Deneb Pinjo, Asya, Nurhat Şensesli, Zeynep Talu, Garo Mafyan, Erdinç Şenyaylar, Sadun Ersönmez

Asya (singer) albums
1996 albums